American Psycho is a musical with music and lyrics by Duncan Sheik and a book by Roberto Aguirre-Sacasa. It is based on the controversial 1991 novel American Psycho by Bret Easton Ellis, which also inspired a 2000 film of the same name, which starred Christian Bale. Set in Manhattan during the Wall Street boom of the late 1980s, American Psycho is about the daily life of Patrick Bateman, a wealthy young investment banker who is also a serial killer.

The musical received its world premiere at London's Almeida Theatre in 2013, directed by Rupert Goold and starring Doctor Who actor Matt Smith. A Broadway production began preview performances on 24 March 2016, at the Gerald Schoenfeld Theatre, directed by Goold and starring Benjamin Walker as Patrick Bateman.

Background
The musical is based on the 1991 novel American Psycho by Bret Easton Ellis. In 2008, producers David Johnson, Jesse Singer, Nate Bolotin and Aaron Ray purchased the stage rights and were developing a musical adaptation of the novel to appear on Broadway. In 2010, the project had rounded out the key elements. Duncan Sheik, who won a Grammy and two Tony Awards for writing the songs in the Broadway hit Spring Awakening, and playwright Roberto Aguirre-Sacasa had completed the first act. A workshop took place in Manhattan in 2011, with Benjamin Walker playing the lead role of Patrick Bateman. In April 2012, London theatre company Headlong was set to stage the musical's world premiere at the Almedia Theatre during their 2012–13 season. At the same time a Kickstarter campaign was launched to raise $150,000, to allow them to have a live orchestra and extend the rehearsal period for the production to seven weeks.

Plot
From the 2016 Broadway production

Act I

Patrick Bateman is a 26-year-old investment banker living in New York City at the end of the 1980s. As the show begins, Bateman documents his morning routine, which involves fastidious grooming, tanning and carefully selecting a designer suit, before travelling to Wall Street ("Opening (Morning Routine)"/"Selling Out"). He arrives at Pierce & Pierce, the elite bank for which he works, and is greeted by his doting secretary, Jean ("Everybody Wants to Rule the World"). He anxiously enquires about the Fisher account, an exclusive account that is highly sought after by Patrick and his colleagues. Later, Patrick has lunch with his coworkers, Tim Price, Craig McDermott, Luis Carruthers and David Van Patten. They exchange fashion tips and critique restaurants before another colleague, Paul Owen, enters. Patrick learns that Owen has secured the Fisher account as well as reservations at Dorsia, New York's most exclusive new restaurant. Absurdly jealous, Patrick attempts to save face by showing everyone his new business card, which leads Owen to show his ("Cards"). Owen mistakes Patrick as Marcus Halberstam, another coworker of Bateman's. Patrick then invites him to his birthday dinner, thrown by his girlfriend Evelyn Williams and Courtney Lawrence, her best friend and Luis Carruthers' girlfriend. Patrick calls Evelyn, telling her about Owen coming to the party. Evelyn hates the idea of having an odd number at her table, so Patrick also invites Jean to appease her. Evelyn, Courtney and the female ensemble then sing about how expensive their clothes are, showing how materialistic they are. ("You Are What You Wear").

Patrick and Price arrive at Evelyn's townhouse late, which irritates Evelyn. Over dinner, the party blandly pontificate about social and political issues, such as homelessness, gentrification and the Sri Lankan Civil War. Patrick makes a scene by butchering his birthday cake with a huge knife he is carrying. After dinner, Patrick and Price go to a club, where they dance and snort cocaine ("True Faith"/"Killing Time"). Suddenly overcome with despair and an awareness of the hollowness of his existence, Patrick leaves the club and angrily vows to never go clubbing again ("In The Air Tonight"). Patrick meets a homeless man on the street, offering him money before taunting him and killing him.

At the gym, Patrick's coworkers work out and comment on the physiques of their female instructors ("Hardbody"). Meanwhile, it is revealed that Patrick is having an affair with Courtney. After having sex, Courtney decides to end the affair, telling a dismissive Patrick that they are betraying their respective partners. He meets his friends at the gym and attempts to strangle Luis in the steamroom. Luis interprets Patrick's actions as a sexual advance and begs him to continue; disgusted, Patrick flees. During the intermission of a showing of Les Misérables, Evelyn broaches the subject of marriage with Patrick, who is not convinced by the prospect ("If We Get Married").

Patrick heads to the Meatpacking District and picks up a prostitute named Christine, introducing himself to her as Paul Owen. He hires another prostitute named Sabrina and pays the two to engage in violent, sadistic sex with one another and with him ("Not A Common Man"). On Christmas Eve, Patrick waxes lyrical about Les Misérables to Jean and the two discuss their plans for the holidays. Patrick escorts his mother to Evelyn's Christmas party, where he binges on drugs and alcohol ("Mistletoe Alert"). He runs into Paul Owen at the party and invites him back to his apartment. The two dance to "Hip to be Square". Patrick spikes Owen's drink, puts on a raincoat and begins a long one-sided analysis of the artistic and commercial merits of the band Huey Lewis and the News. After stating that "the world is better off with some people gone" (implying, at once, both himself and Owen), Patrick slaughters Owen with an axe.

Act II

Patrick takes Owen's body to an apartment he owns anonymously and dissolves it in a bathtub with a bag of lye. Afterwards, he lets himself into Paul's apartment and stages his disappearance by resetting his voicemail and packing many of his possessions into a suitcase ("Clean"). Months pass, during which Patrick murders several people ("Killing Spree"). One afternoon, Patrick's mother arrives on Wall Street expecting to have lunch with her son; Patrick, who has totally forgotten about the appointment, panics and begs Jean to get rid of her. Jean convinces Patrick to attend the lunch and offers to join the pair. Much to Jean's delight, Mrs. Bateman tells her stories about Patrick as a child, and says they would make a good couple ("Nice Thought"). Back at Pierce & Pierce, Detective Donald Kimball calls on Patrick to question him about Owen's disappearance. Uneasy, Patrick tries his hardest to evade questioning and asks Kimball to keep him updated about the manhunt. Keen to disentangle himself from New York, Patrick calls Evelyn and suggests a holiday, and so the two take a short break in the Hamptons. The idyllic setting cannot heal Patrick's psyche, however; while Evelyn flourishes amid garden parties and Pilates classes, Patrick's grasp on reality loosens further ("At The End of An Island"/"Hardbody Hamptons"). He promises Evelyn that if they return to New York he will marry her. On his return, he appropriates Paul Owen's apartment as a place to host and kill more victims, beginning with Sabrina and Christine ("I Am Back").

Luis runs into Patrick at a Barneys store and begs Patrick to run away with him. Patrick responds aggressively, assaulting and hissing at Luis. With his appetite for murder now totally unchecked, Patrick targets Jean, offering to take her to dinner at a restaurant of her choice. His sense of inferiority is piqued once again when she suggests Dorsia, where he is still unable to get reservations. Patrick gives Jean the rest of the day off and she wonders about her feelings for Patrick ("A Girl Before"). At Patrick's apartment that night, the pair discuss her hopes and aspirations. As he is preparing to murder her, Jean tells Patrick that she is in love with him; her confession causes him great distress and he implores her to leave. He leaves a long voicemail for Kimball confessing to the murder of Paul Owen and countless other people ("Clean (Reprise)").

The next morning, Jean apologises to Patrick for what happened the night before. He forgives her and tells her that he will be recommending her for a junior executive program through a company scheme. Tim Price unexpectedly arrives at Patrick's office, having been AWOL from Pierce & Pierce since Patrick's birthday. Patrick asks him where he's been; Price responds by saying that he's been in New York the whole time, but their paths haven't crossed. He also asks Patrick about Paul Owen's disappearance.

Patrick and Evelyn have their engagement party at Tunnel nightclub ("Don't You Want Me"). Patrick is noticeably ill at ease and is desperate to go to dinner. Price says he is able to get reservations at Dorsia, which impresses the guests. Patrick sees Kimball at the bar and approaches him, asking him about the voicemail confession. Kimball breaks into laughter, stating that he found Patrick's 'joke' "hilarious", despite Bateman's protestations that the confessions were genuine. Kimball tells Patrick that his narrative of what happened to Owen is impossible, as Owen is in fact in London; Kimball allegedly had dinner with him there twice. The next day, Patrick goes to Paul Owen's apartment, expecting it to be full of decomposing bodies and cordoned off by the police. Instead, he finds the apartment vacant and in pristine condition; the real estate agent, Mrs Wolfe, deflects all of Patrick's questions about Paul Owen and the bodies that were left in the apartment, before asking him to leave and never return. He marries Evelyn and resigns himself to a pointless existence in which the punishment and notoriety that he craves will forever be denied him ("This Is Not An Exit").

Production history
American Psycho began previews on 3 December 2013, at the Almeida Theatre, London, before holding its official opening night on 12 December, with booking initially until 25 January, but later extended by a week to 1 February 2014, when it closed. The show has a book by Roberto Aguirre-Sacasa with music and lyrics by Duncan Sheik, and is directed by Rupert Goold, with choreography by Lynne Page, set design by Es Devlin, lighting design by Jon Clark, costume design by Katrina Lindsay, video by Finn Ross, musical direction by David Shrubsole and sound by Paul Arditti. Tickets for the world premiere production sold out. Notable casting for the show included Matt Smith as Patrick Bateman, Susannah Fielding as Evelyn Williams, Jonathan Bailey as Tim Price, Ben Aldridge as Paul Owen and Lucie Jones as Victoria. A typical London performance ran 2hrs 40mins, including one interval of 20 mins.

Following its premiere production, a workshop of the musical was held in January 2015 in New York City. The same year, the musical was scheduled to open in Broadway in March 2016, following previews from February 19, at a yet unknown Shubert theater. Lead casting would include Benjamin Walker in the lead role of Patrick Bateman, reprising his role from the 2011 workshop. The musical had a preview performances at the Gerald Schoenfeld Theatre on March 24, 2016. Tony Award winner Alice Ripley joined the cast as Patrick Bateman's mother and Mrs. Wolfe, along with Tony Award nominee Jennifer Damiano as Jean, and Heléne Yorke as Evelyn Williams. Damiano previously worked with Sheik in the original production of Spring Awakening on Broadway, as well as with co-starring opposite Ripley as Mother and Daughter in the original production of Next to Normal.

The musical had a closing date of June 5, 2016 for the Broadway production, after 27 previews and 54 regular performances.

The Australian premiere production opened at the Hayes Theatre in Sydney on May 10, 2019, and played until June 14, completely selling out their season. This production was directed by Alex Berlage and starred Ben Gerrard as Patrick Bateman. The production received nine Sydney Theatre Awards, and transferred to the Sydney Opera House's Playhouse for a season in June 2021 before a limited Australian tour.

Musical numbers
Sheik's music features an original electronic score, with extracts from 1980s songs in-between. The London cast album was released in March 2016.

London 

Act I
 "Opening (Morning Routine)" - Patrick Bateman
 "Cards" - Patrick, Paul Owen, Tim Price, and Businessmen
 "You Are What You Wear" - Evelyn Williams, Courtney Lawrence, and Women
 "Oh Sri Lanka" - Patrick and Party Guests
 "True Faith" - Company
 "Killing Time" - Patrick and Tim
 "In the Air Tonight" - Company
 "Medley: Hardbody / Hardbody Luis" - Luis Carruthers, Courtney, Patrick, and Company
 "If We Get Married" - Evelyn, Patrick, and Jean
 "Not A Common Man" - Patrick
 "Mistletoe Alert" Patrick and Company
 "Hip to Be Square" - Patrick and Paul

Act II
 "Clean (reprise)" - Patrick and Company
 "Killing Spree" - Patrick, Evelyn, Luis, and Company
 "A Nice Thought" - Patrick's Mother, Jean, and Women
 "End of An Island" - Patrick, Evelyn, and Company
 "I Am Back" - Patrick and Company
 "A Girl Before" - Jean
 "Don't You Want Me" - Company
 "This Is Not an Exit" - Patrick, Paul, and Company

Broadway 

Act I
"Opening (Morning Routine)" - Patrick Bateman
"Selling Out" - Patrick and Company
"Everybody Wants To Rule The World" - Jean and Company
"Cards" - Paul Owen, Patrick, Timothy Price, David Van Patten, Craig McDermott, and Luis Carruthers 
"You Are What You Wear" - Evelyn Williams, Courtney Lawrence, and Women
"True Faith" - Vanden and Company
"Killing Time" - Patrick and Price
"In The Air Tonight" - Women Soloists and Company
"Hardbody" - Hardbody Trainer, McDermott, Van Patten, Carruthers and Men
"You Are What You Wear" (reprise)
"If We Get Married" - Evelyn, Patrick, Jean
"Not A Common Man" - Patrick
"Mistletoe Alert" - Evelyn, Patrick, and Company
"Hip To Be Square" - Patrick and Paul

Act II
"Clean" - Patrick and Company 
"Killing Spree" - Patrick
"Nice Thought" - Mrs. Bateman, Jean, and Women
"At The End Of An Island" - Evelyn, Bateman, and Company
"I Am Back" - Patrick and Company
"You Are What You Wear" (reprise)
"A Girl Before" - Jean
"Clean" (reprise) - Company 
"Don't You Want Me" - Paul, Sean Bateman, Carruthers, and Company
"This Is Not An Exit" - Patrick and Company

Principal roles and cast members

Critical reception
The London production of American Psycho received mixed to positive reviews from critics.

Awards and nominations

Popular culture references
In 2022, an amateur production of the musical is the focus of the sixth-season episode titled "Chapter One Hundred and Twelve: American Psychos" in Riverdale, a series created by Roberto Aguirre-Sacasa.

References

External links 

 
 

2013 musicals
Musicals based on novels
Broadway musicals
Kickstarter projects
American Psycho
Crimes against sex workers in fiction